"Slide" is a song by American alternative rock group Goo Goo Dolls. It was released as the first single from their sixth studio album, Dizzy Up the Girl, in September 1998. According to lead guitarist John Rzeznik, the song is about a Catholic girl who becomes pregnant and discusses with her boyfriend how they should react to it. Musically, the track is a jangle pop and alternative rock song.

"Slide" reached number one on the US Billboard Adult Top 40 chart, the Modern Rock Tracks chart, and the Mainstream Top 40 chart. On the Billboard Hot 100, the song peaked at number eight in February 1999. In Canada, the song debuted atop the RPM Top Singles chart on October 19, 1998, becoming the band's second number-one single on that chart after "Iris". Worldwide, "Slide" reached number 14 in Iceland, number 29 in Australia, number 36 in New Zealand and number 43 in the United Kingdom.

Meaning and composition
In a 2002 performance on VH1 Storytellers, John Rzeznik explained that the song refers to a teenage girl in a strict Catholic environment who has become pregnant. She and her boyfriend are debating as to the possibility of abortion or marriage, which is presented in the song as the verse "do you want to get married or run away". A jangle pop and alternative rock song, "Slide" is written in cut time with a key of F minor.

Chart performance
"Slide" peaked atop three US Billboard charts: the  Adult Top 40 chart, the Modern Rock Tracks chart, and the Mainstream Top 40 chart. On the all-genre Billboard Hot 100, the song peaked at number eight in February 1999 and became the United States' thirteenth best-selling song of 1999. In October 2012, "Slide" was ranked number nine on Billboards "Top 100 Pop Songs 1992–2012" chart, which also featured two other Goo Goo Dolls hits: "Iris" (number one) and "Name" (number 24). The Goo Goo Dolls are the only musicians to have three songs chart on the list, two breaking the top 10 and all three falling within the top 25. They are also the only musicians that have back to back singles ("Iris" and "Slide") featured on the list. The Recording Industry Association of America (RIAA) awarded the song a platinum certification in June 2022.

In Canada, the song accomplished a rare feat by debuting at number one on the RPM 100 Hit Tracks chart, on October 19, 1998. Not counting the number-one song on the magazine's first issue, it became only the third (and final) song to debut at number one on this chart, after Band Aid's "Do They Know It's Christmas?" in 1985 and Tom Cochrane's "I Wish You Well" in 1995. After its debut, "Slide" spent a second week at number one, then dropped to number four on November 2. It spent a total of 26 weeks in the top 20 and remained in the top 100 until the end of 1999. The song also reached number 22 on the RPM Adult Contemporary Tracks chart and number five on the Alternative 30 chart. It was the 18th-most-successful single of Canada in 1999.

Outside North America, "Slide" underperformed in most countries. It debuted at number 45 on the Australian Singles Chart on January 17, 1999, then slowly climbed up the chart until reaching its peak of number 29 on March 7. Afterwards, it dropped out of the top 30 and left the chart five weeks after peaking. Despite its low peak, it earned a gold certification for sales exceeding 35,000 copies. In neighboring New Zealand, the single first appeared at number 41 on February 21 and peaked at number 36 the following week, then spent three more weeks in the top 50. On the UK Singles Chart, "Slide" debuted and peaked at number 43 on March 27, but spent only one more week on the chart before dropping out of the top 100. On the UK Indie Chart, which ranks songs released by independent record labels, it reached number eight. It attained its highest European peak in Iceland, where it charted at number 14 for two weeks.

Music video

The music video was directed by Nancy Bardawil and partially filmed at the El Dorado Hotel on South Spring Street, Los Angeles.

Track listings

UK CD single
 "Slide" (album version) – 3:33
 "Acoustic #3" – 1:57
 "Nothing Can Change You" – 3:14

European CD single
 "Slide" (album version) – 3:33
 "Acoustic #3" – 1:57

Australian maxi-CD single
 "Slide"
 "Nothing Can Change You"
 "Acoustic #3"

Charts

Weekly charts

Year-end charts

All-time charts

Certifications

Release history

References

1998 singles
Goo Goo Dolls songs
Jangle pop songs
RPM Top Singles number-one singles
Song recordings produced by Rob Cavallo
Songs about abortion
Songs about marriage
Songs about parenthood
Songs written by John Rzeznik
Warner Records singles